Seeed is a German hip hop, reggae and dancehall band based in Berlin. Founded in 1998, they have become well known in Germany and its neighboring countries.

Musical style and lyrics 

Seeed consists of eleven band members, including three singers, a horn section and a DJ. Seeed is recognized for their catchy fusional mix of German hip hop, reggae and dancehall styles and their use of horns, which is unusual in contemporary popular music. They have worked with Cee-Lo Green, Anthony B, Tanya Stephens, General Degree as well as other Jamaican artists and producers. Almost all of their music releases feature a popular guest experience. Seeed's lyrics are in German, English and Patois. Their biggest hits in the German Sprachraum were "Dickes B", "Aufstehn", "Ding" and "Music Monks".  Although their lyrics are in English and German, most of the songs in German were completely translated into English for the international releases of the Albums Next! and Music Monks.

History 
Their first hit was "Dickes B", an ode to Berlin. They won three ECHO Awards. With the international versions of Music Monks and Next!, they found broader success in Germany's neighboring countries, especially France.  After their initial success with "Dickes B",  in the year 2000, they released their first full-length album a few months later, in 2001: New Dubby Conquerors.

In September 2012, Seeed released their fourth studio album, Seeed, their first release in six years. In the meantime, members Peter Fox, Dellé and Demba Nabé (Boundzound) each released solo albums. The album Seeed went straight to number 1 in the German Albums Chart. It was the first time an album of Seeed achieved the top of the albums chart.

On 31 May 2018, Demba Nabé (Boundzound) died at the age of 46.

On 18 April 2019, Seeed released their first Single "Ticket" after Nabé's death. The band dedicated this song to their former member.

The fifth album "Bam Bam" was released 4 October 2019.

Discography

Albums

Singles

EPs 
 2002: Waterpumpee
 2003: The Electric Boogie
 2005: Aufstehn!
 2011: Molotov / Wonderful Life
 2012: Beautiful

DVD 
 2006: Live!

Riddims 
 "Rodeo" (2005 Germaican Rec.)
 "Rodeo Refix" (2005 Germaican Rec.)
 "High Noon" (2005 Germaican Rec.)
 "Curefix" (2004 Germaican Rec.)
 "Doctors Darling" (2003 Germaican Rec.)
 "Electric Boogie" (2003 Germaican Rec.)
 "Pharaoh" (2003 Germaican Rec.)
 "FrogAss" (2001 Germaican Rec.)

References

External links 
 Seeed's official website
 Germaican Records International the 45-Label of Seeed

Participants in the Bundesvision Song Contest
Musical groups from Berlin